The Pentagun is a five-round shotgun manufactured by the Brazilian firm ENARM (Empresa Nacional de Armas). It has a revolver-type cylinder and could be fired double action only. 
Gas blow-by between cylinder and barrel was prevented by means of movable barrel, which was pulled just prior to firing 1.5mm backwards into the corresponding recesses in cylinder. The shotgun utilizes a straight-line configuration (similar to AR-15) in order to minimize muzzle rise when firing.

References

External links
 ENARM Pentagun / Internet Movie Firearms Database

Shotguns of Brazil
Bullpup shotguns
Revolver shotguns
Semi-automatic shotguns